Coral City is an unincorporated community located in the town of Pigeon, Trempealeau County, Wisconsin, United States.

References

Unincorporated communities in Trempealeau County, Wisconsin
Unincorporated communities in Wisconsin